

Current sporting seasons

Auto racing 2012

World Rally Championship

Basketball 2012

NBA
NCAA Division I men
NCAA Division I women
Euroleague
EuroLeague Women
Eurocup
EuroChallenge
ASEAN Basketball League
Australia
France
Germany
Greece
Israel
Italy
Philippines
Commissioner's Cup
Russia
Spain
Turkey

Cricket 2012

Australia:
Sheffield Shield
Ryobi One-Day Cup

Football (soccer) 2012

National teams competitions
2014 FIFA World Cup qualification
UEFA Women's Euro 2013 qualifying
International clubs competitions
UEFA (Europe) Champions League
UEFA Europa League
UEFA Women's Champions League
Copa Libertadores (South America)
CONCACAF (North & Central America) Champions League
OFC (Oceania) Champions League
Domestic (national) competitions
Australia
England
France
Germany
Iran
Italy
Portugal
Russia
Scotland
Spain

Ice hockey 2012

National Hockey League
Kontinental Hockey League
Czech Extraliga
Elitserien
Canadian Hockey League:
OHL, QMJHL, WHL
NCAA Division I men
NCAA Division I women

Rugby union 2012

Heineken Cup
Amlin Challenge Cup
Aviva Premiership
RaboDirect Pro12
LV= Cup
Top 14
Sevens World Series

Snooker 2012

Players Tour Championship

Tennis 2012

ATP World Tour
WTA Tour

Volleyball 2012

International clubs competitions
Men's CEV Champions League
Women's CEV Champions League

Winter sports

Alpine Skiing World Cup
Biathlon World Cup
Bobsleigh World Cup
Cross-Country Skiing World Cup
Freestyle Skiing World Cup
Luge World Cup
Nordic Combined World Cup
Short Track Speed Skating World Cup
Skeleton World Cup
Ski Jumping World Cup
Snowboard World Cup
Speed Skating World Cup

Days of the month

April 30, 2012 (Monday)

Field hockey
Men's Olympic Qualifying Tournament in Kakamigahara, Japan, matchday 3:
 2–1 
 0–11 
 2–5

April 29, 2012 (Sunday)

Auto racing
World Rally Championship:
Rally Argentina: (1) Sébastien Loeb  (Citroën DS3 WRC) (2) Mikko Hirvonen  (Citroën DS3 WRC) (3) Mads Østberg  (Ford Fiesta RS WRC)
Loeb wins his 70th rally.

Cycling
UCI World Tour:
Tour de Romandie, stage 5: (1) Bradley Wiggins  (2) Andrew Talansky  (3) Richie Porte 
Final general classification:  Wiggins  Talansky  Rui Costa 
UCI World Tour standings (after 14 of 28 races): (1) Tom Boonen  366 points (2) Vincenzo Nibali  272 (3) Samuel Sánchez  252

Field hockey
Women's Olympic Qualifying Tournament in Kakamigahara, Japan, matchday 3:
 0–0 
 0–5 
 2–2

Golf
PGA Tour:
Zurich Classic of New Orleans in New Orleans, United States:
Winner: Jason Dufner  269 PO (−19) 
Dufner wins his first PGA title.
European Tour:
Ballantine's Championship in Icheon, South Korea:
Winner: Bernd Wiesberger  270 (–18)
Wiesberger wins his first European Tour title.
LPGA Tour:
Mobile Bay LPGA Classic in Mobile, Alabama, United States:
Winner: Stacy Lewis  271 (–17)
Lewis wins her second LPGA Tour title.

Motorcycle racing
MotoGP:
Spanish Grand Prix in Jerez, Spain (ESP unless stated):
Moto GP: (1) Casey Stoner  (Honda) (2) Jorge Lorenzo (Yamaha) (3) Dani Pedrosa (Honda)
Moto2: (1) Pol Espargaró (Kalex) (2) Marc Márquez (Suter) (3) Thomas Lüthi  (Suter)
Moto3: (1) Romano Fenati  (FTR–Honda) (2) Luis Salom (Kalex–KTM) (3) Sandro Cortese  (KTM)

Tennis
ATP World Tour:
Barcelona Open Banc Sabadell in Barcelona, Spain:
Final: Rafael Nadal  def. David Ferrer  7–6 (1), 7–5
Nadal wins his 7th Barcelona Open title and his 48th ATP title. 
BRD Năstase Țiriac Trophy in Bucharest, Romania:
Final: Gilles Simon  def. Fabio Fognini  6–4, 6–3
Simon wins his 3rd Bucharest Open title and his 10th ATP title. 
WTA Tour:
Porsche Tennis Grand Prix in Stuttgart, Germany:
Final: Maria Sharapova  def. Victoria Azarenka  6–1, 6–4
Sharapova wins her 25th WTA title.
Grand Prix SAR La Princesse Lalla Meryem in Fes, Morocco;
Final: Kiki Bertens  def. Laura Pous Tió  7–5, 6–0
Bertens wins her first WTA title.

April 28, 2012 (Saturday)

Auto racing
Sprint Cup Series:
Capital City 400 in Richmond, Virginia: (1)  Kyle Busch (Toyota; Joe Gibbs Racing) (2)  Dale Earnhardt Jr. (Chevrolet; Hendrick Motorsports) (3)  Tony Stewart (Chevrolet; Stewart-Haas Racing)

Field hockey
Men's Olympic Qualifying Tournament in Kakamigahara, Japan, matchday 2:
 6–2 
 0–8 
 4–1

April 27, 2012 (Friday)

Auto racing
Nationwide Series:
Virginia 529 College Savings 250 in Richmond, Virginia: (1)  Kurt Busch (Toyota; Kyle Busch Motorsports) (2)  Denny Hamlin (Toyota; Joe Gibbs Racing) (3)  Kevin Harvick (Chevrolet; Richard Childress Racing)

Field hockey
Women's Olympic Qualifying Tournament in Kakamigahara, Japan, matchday 2:
 3–0 
 8–0 
 0–3

April 26, 2012 (Thursday)

Field hockey
Men's Olympic Qualifying Tournament in Kakamigahara, Japan, matchday 1:
 1–0 
 6–0 
 11–1

Football (soccer)
UEFA Europa League semi-finals, second leg (first leg scores in parentheses):
Valencia  0–1 (2–4)  Atlético Madrid. Atlético Madrid win 5–2 on aggregate.
Athletic Bilbao  3–1 (1–2)  Sporting CP. Athletic Bilbao win 4–3 on aggregate.

April 25, 2012 (Wednesday)

Field hockey
Women's Olympic Qualifying Tournament in Kakamigahara, Japan, matchday 1:
 1–3 
 7–0 
 4–0

Football (soccer)
UEFA Champions League semi-finals, second leg (first leg score in parentheses): Real Madrid  2–1 (a.e.t.) (1–2)  Bayern Munich. 3–3 on aggregate; Bayern Munich win 3–1 on penalties.
AFC Cup group stage Matchday 5:
Group A:
Al-Suwaiq  1–5  Al-Qadsia
Al-Ittihad  1–4  Al-Faisaly
Group B:
Al-Oruba  4–1  East Bengal
Kazma  1–2  Arbil
Group E:
Al-Zawra'a  2–1  Al-Shorta
Safa  1–0  Al-Tilal
Group F:
Tampines Rovers  0–0  Kitchee
Terengganu  6–2  Song Lam Nghe An
CONCACAF Champions League Finals second leg (first leg score in parentheses): Santos Laguna  2–1 (0–2)  Monterrey. Monterrey win 3–2 on aggregate.
Monterrey win the title for the second time.
Copa Libertadores Round of 16, first leg:
Internacional  0–0  Fluminense
Bolívar  2–1  Santos
UEFA Women's Euro 2013 qualifying:
Group 3:  0–1

April 24, 2012 (Tuesday)

Football (soccer)
UEFA Champions League semi-finals, second leg (first leg score in parentheses): Barcelona  2–2 (0–1)  Chelsea. Chelsea win 3–2 on aggregate.
AFC Cup group stage, matchday 5:
Group C:
VB  0–1  Al-Ahed
Al-Ettifaq  2–2  Al-Kuwait
Group D:
Salgaocar  3–1  Al-Oruba
Al-Wehdat  3–1  Neftchi Farg'ona
Group G:
Chonburi  1–0  Yangon United
Citizen  1–2  Home United
Group H:
Ayeyawady United  0–3  Arema
Navibank Sài Gòn  1–2  Kelantan

April 23, 2012 (Monday)

April 22, 2012 (Sunday)

Auto racing
Formula One:
 in Sakhir, Bahrain: (1) Sebastian Vettel  (Red Bull–Renault) (2) Kimi Räikkönen  (Lotus-Renault) (3) Romain Grosjean  (Lotus-Renault)
Sprint Cup Series:
STP 400 in Kansas City, Kansas: (1)  Denny Hamlin (Toyota; Joe Gibbs Racing) (2)  Martin Truex Jr. (Toyota; Michael Waltrip Racing) (3)  Jimmie Johnson (Chevrolet; Hendrick Motorsports)

Cycling
UCI World Tour:
Liège–Bastogne–Liège:  Maxim Iglinsky   Vincenzo Nibali   Enrico Gasparotto 
UCI World Tour standings (after 13 of 28 races): (1) Tom Boonen  366 points (2) Nibali 272 (3) Samuel Sánchez  252

Equestrianism
Show Jumping World Cup:
World Cup Final in 's-Hertogenbosch, Netherlands:  Rich Fellers  on Flexible  Steve Guerdat  on Nino des Buissonnets  Pius Schwizer  on Ulysse & Carlina

Golf
PGA Tour:
Valero Texas Open in San Antonio:
Winner: Ben Curtis  280 (−8)
Curtis wins his fourth PGA Tour title.
European Tour:
Volvo China Open in Tianjin, China:
Winner: Branden Grace  267 (−21)
Grace wins his third European Tour title.

Ice hockey
World U18 Championship:
Bronze medal game:  4–5  
Final:   0–7  
The United States win their fourth consecutive title, and their seventh overall.

Tennis
ATP World Tour:
Monte-Carlo Masters:
Final: Rafael Nadal  def. Novak Djokovic  6–3, 6–1
Nadal wins in Monte Carlo for the eighth successive year, winning his 20th Masters 1000 title and his 47th ATP Tour title.
WTA Tour:
Fed Cup semifinals:
 2–3 
Ana Ivanovic  def. Anastasia Pavlyuchenkova  3–6, 6–0, 6–3
Jelena Janković  def. Svetlana Kuznetsova  6–1, 6–4
Anastasia Pavlyuchenkova/Elena Vesnina  def. Aleksandra Krunić/Bojana Jovanovski  6–4, 6–0
 1–4 
Petra Kvitová  def. Francesca Schiavone  6–4, 7–6(1)
Sara Errani  def. Andrea Hlaváčková  2–6, 6–2, 6–2
Andrea Hlaváčková/Lucie Hradecká  def. Sara Errani/Flavia Pennetta  6–5 retired

Water polo
Women's Olympic Games Qualification Tournament:
Bronze medal game:  13–18  
Final:   9–5

April 21, 2012 (Saturday)

Baseball
Major League Baseball: Chicago White Sox 4, Seattle Mariners 0
White Sox pitcher Philip Humber throws the 21st perfect game in Major League Baseball history; the first since Roy Halladay on May 29, .

Equestrianism
Dressage World Cup:
World Cup Final in 's-Hertogenbosch, Netherlands:  Adelinde Cornelissen  on Parzival  Helen Langehanenberg  on Damon Hill NRW  Valentina Truppa  on Eremo del Castegno

Golf
LPGA Tour:
LPGA Lotte Championship in Kapolei, Hawaii:
Winner: Ai Miyazato  276 (−12)
Miyazato wins her eighth LPGA Tour title.

Mixed martial arts
UFC 145 in Atlanta, Georgia, United States (USA unless stated):
Lightweight bout: Mark Bocek  def. John Alessio  via unanimous decision (30–27, 29–28, 30–27)
Featherweight bout: Eddie Yagin def. Mark Hominick  via split decision (29–28, 28–29, 29–28)
Bantamweight bout: Michael McDonald def. Miguel Torres via KO (punches)
Heavyweight bout: Ben Rothwell def. Brendan Schaub via KO (punches)
Welterweight bout: Rory MacDonald  def. Che Mills  via TKO (punches)
Light Heavyweight Championship bout: Jon Jones (c) def. Rashad Evans via unanimous decision (49–46, 49–46, 50–45)

Tennis
WTA Tour:
Fed Cup semifinals:
 1–1 
Jelena Janković  def. Anastasia Pavlyuchenkova  6–4, 6–3
Svetlana Kuznetsova  def. Ana Ivanovic  6–2, 2–6, 6–4
 0–2 
Lucie Šafářová  def. Francesca Schiavone  7–6(3), 6–1
Petra Kvitová  def. Sara Errani  6–4, 6–3

Water polo
Women's Olympic Games Qualification Tournament Semi-finals in Trieste, Italy:
 8–10 
 13–14

April 20, 2012 (Friday)

Baseball
Major League Baseball: Cincinnati Reds 9, Chicago Cubs 4
The Reds become the sixth franchise to record 10,000 wins in Major League Baseball.

Ice hockey
World U18 Championship Semifinals in Brno, Czech Republic: 
 7–3 
 2–1

Water polo
Women's Olympic Games Qualification Tournament Quarter-finals in Trieste, Italy (winners qualify for the Olympic Games):
 18–5 
 7–6 
 9–7 
 7–6

April 19, 2012 (Thursday)

Football (soccer)
UEFA Europa League semi-finals, first leg:
Atlético Madrid  4–2  Valencia
Sporting CP  2–1  Athletic Bilbao
2012 Copa Libertadores second stage, final matchday (teams in bold advance to the Round of 16):
Group 1: 
Juan Aurich  1–0  Internacional
Santos  2–0  The Strongest
Standings: Santos 13 points, Internacional 8, The Strongest 7, Juan Aurich 6.
Group 8:
Universidad de Chile  2–1  Atlético Nacional
Peñarol  4–2  Godoy Cruz
Standings: Universidad de Chile 13 points, Atlético Nacional 11, Godoy Cruz 5, Peñarol 4.

Ice hockey
World U18 Championship Quarterfinals:
 8–0 
 2–4

April 18, 2012 (Wednesday)

Cycling
UCI World Tour:
La Flèche Wallonne:  Joaquim Rodríguez   Michael Albasini   Philippe Gilbert 
UCI World Tour standings (after 12 of 28 races): (1) Tom Boonen  366 points (2) Peter Sagan  229 (3) Rodríguez & Samuel Sánchez  222
UCI Women's Road World Cup: 
La Flèche Wallonne:  Evelyn Stevens   Marianne Vos   Linda Villumsen

Football (soccer)
UEFA Champions League semi-finals, first leg: Chelsea  1–0  Barcelona
Copa Libertadores second stage, final matchday (teams in bold advance to the Round of 16):
Group 4:
Arsenal  1–2  Fluminense
Boca Juniors  2–0  Zamora
Standings: Fluminense 15 points, Boca Juniors 13, Arsenal 6, Zamora 1.
Group 6:
Corinthians  6–0  Deportivo Táchira
Cruz Azul  4–1  Nacional
Standings: Corinthians 14 points, Cruz Azul 11, Nacional 4, Deportivo Táchira 3.
CONCACAF Champions League Finals, first leg: Monterrey  2–0  Santos Laguna
AFC Champions League group stage, matchday 4:
Group A:
Nasaf Qarshi  0–1  Al-Rayyan
Al-Jazira  1–1  Esteghlal
Group C:
Lekhwiya  1–0  Sepahan
Al-Ahli  3–1  Al-Nasr
Group E:
Adelaide United  1–0  Pohang Steelers
Bunyodkor  3–2  Gamba Osaka
Group G:
Nagoya Grampus  0–0  Tianjin Teda
Seongnam Ilhwa Chunma  5–0  Central Coast Mariners

April 17, 2012 (Tuesday)

Baseball
Major League Baseball: Colorado Rockies 5, San Diego Padres 3
Rockies pitcher Jamie Moyer earns the win to become the oldest pitcher to win a game in Major League Baseball history at the age of 49 years, 151 days. Moyer's mark surpassed Jack Quinn's previous record of 49 years, 70 days from September 13, .

Football (soccer)
UEFA Champions League semi-finals, first leg: Bayern Munich  2–1  Real Madrid
Copa Libertadores second stage, final matchday (teams in bold advance to the Round of 16):
Group 3:
Junior  2–1  Unión Española
Bolívar  3–0  Universidad Católica
Standings: Unión Española, Bolívar 10 points, Junior 7, Universidad Católica 6.
Group 7:
Vélez Sársfield  1–3  Defensor Sporting
Deportivo Quito  5–0  Guadalajara
Standings: Velez Sársfield 12 points, Deportivo Quito 10, Defensor Sporting 9, Guadalajara 4.
AFC Champions League group stage, matchday 4:
Group B:
Bani Yas  0–0  Al-Ittihad
Al-Arabi  0–1  Pakhtakor
Group D:
Persepolis  1–1  Al-Gharafa
Al-Hilal  2–1  Al-Shabab
Group F:
Brisbane Roar  1–2  Ulsan Hyundai
FC Tokyo  3–0  Beijing Guoan
Group H:
Jeonbuk Hyundai Motors  3–2  Buriram United
Guangzhou Evergrande  3–1  Kashiwa Reysol

Ice hockey
World U18 Championship Preliminary round (teams in bold advance to the semifinals, teams in italics advance to the quarterfinals):
Group A:
 2–6 
 5–3 
Standings: United States 12 points, Finland 9, Canada 6, Czech Republic 3,  0.
Group B:
 2–0 
 2–6 
Standings: Sweden 12 points, Russia, Germany, Latvia 6, Switzerland 0.

April 16, 2012 (Monday)

Ice hockey
World U18 Championship Preliminary round:
Group A:
 6–2 
 5–1 
Group B:
 4–5 
 6–0

April 15, 2012 (Sunday)

Auto racing
Formula One:
 in Shanghai, China: (1) Nico Rosberg  (Mercedes) (2) Jenson Button  (McLaren–Mercedes) (3) Lewis Hamilton  (McLaren-Mercedes)
IndyCar Series:
Toyota Grand Prix of Long Beach in Long Beach, California: (1) Will Power  (Team Penske) (2) Simon Pagenaud  (Schmidt Hamilton Motorsports) (3) James Hinchcliffe  (Andretti Autosport)

Basketball
Eurocup Basketball Final Four in Khimki, Russia:
Third place game:   Lietuvos Rytas  71–62  Spartak St. Petersburg
Final:  Khimki  77–68   Valencia Basket
Khimki win the title for the first time, becoming the second consecutive, and third overall, Russian team to win the tournament.

Cycling
UCI World Tour:
Amstel Gold Race:  Enrico Gasparotto   Jelle Vanendert   Peter Sagan 
UCI World Tour standings (after 11 of 28 races): (1) Tom Boonen  366 points (2) Sagan 229 (3) Samuel Sánchez  222

Football (soccer)
UEFA Women's Champions League semifinals, first leg:
Arsenal  1–2  1. FFC Frankfurt
Lyon  5–1  Turbine Potsdam

Ice hockey
World U18 Championship Preliminary round:
Group A:  0–4 
Group B:  1–3

Tennis
ATP World Tour:
U.S. Men's Clay Court Championships in Houston, Texas, United States:
Final: Juan Mónaco  def. John Isner  6–2, 3–6, 6–3
Mónaco wins his fifth ATP Tour title.
Grand Prix Hassan II in Casablanca, Morocco:
Final: Pablo Andújar  def. Albert Ramos  6–1, 7–6(5)
Andújar defends his Casablanca title, winning his second ATP Tour title.
WTA Tour:
Barcelona Ladies Open in Barcelona, Spain:
Final: Sara Errani  def. Dominika Cibulková  6–2, 6–2
Errani wins her fourth WTA Tour title.
e-Boks Open in Farum, Denmark:
Final: Angelique Kerber  def. Caroline Wozniacki  6–4, 6–4
Kerber wins her second WTA Tour title.

April 14, 2012 (Saturday)

Auto racing
Sprint Cup Series:
Samsung Mobile 500 in Fort Worth, Texas: (1)  Greg Biffle (Ford; Roush Fenway Racing) (2)  Jimmie Johnson (Chevrolet; Hendrick Motorsports) (3)  Mark Martin (Toyota; Michael Waltrip Racing)

Horse racing
Grand National in Aintree, England:  Neptune Collonges (trainer: Paul Nicholls; jockey: Daryl Jacob)  Sunnyhillboy (trainer: Jonjo O'Neill; jockey: Richie McLernon)  Seabass (trainer: Ted Walsh; jockey: Katie Walsh)

Ice hockey
Women's World Championship:
Bronze medal game:   6–2 
Final:   4–5  
Canada win the title for the tenth time.
World U18 Championship Preliminary round:
Group A:
 5–0 
 2–4 
Group B:
 2–4 
 7–2

Mixed martial arts
UFC on Fuel TV: Gustafsson vs. Silva in Stockholm, Sweden:
Bantamweight bout: Brad Pickett  def. Damacio Page  via submission (rear-naked choke)
Welterweight bout: John Maguire  def. DaMarques Johnson  via submission (armbar)
Featherweight bout: Dennis Siver  def. Diego Nunes  via unanimous decision (29–28, 29–28, 29–28)
Welterweight bout: Siyar Bahadurzada  def. Paulo Thiago  via KO (punch)
Middleweight bout: Brian Stann  def. Alessio Sakara  via KO (punches)
Light Heavyweight bout: Alexander Gustafsson  def. Thiago Silva  via unanimous decision (30–27, 30–27, 29–28)

April 13, 2012 (Friday)

Ice hockey
Women's World Championship Semifinals:
 5–1 
 10–0 
World U18 Championship Preliminary round:
Group A:  8–4 
Group B:  2–4

April 12, 2012 (Thursday)

Boxing
Asian Olympic Qualification Tournament in Astana, Kazakhstan:
Light flyweight: Birzhan Zhakypov  def. Naoya Inoue  16–11. Zhakypov qualifies for the Olympics.
Flyweight: Ilyas Suleimenov  def. Nyambayaryn Tögstsogt  18–14. Suleimenov and Tögstsogt, along with the semifinalists Pak Jong-Chol  and Katsuaki Susa , qualify for the Olympics.
Bantamweight: Shiva Thapa  def. Wissam Salamana  18–11. Thapa and Salamana, along with third-placed Satoshi Shimizu  qualify for the Olympics.
Lightweight: Liu Qiang  def. Charly Suarez  15–11. Liu qualifies for the Olympics.
Light welterweight: Daniyar Yeleussinov  def. Serdar Hudayberdiyev  by WO. Yeleussinov and Hudayberdiyev, along with the semifinalists Uktamjon Rahmonov  and Mehdi Tolouti , qualify for the Olympics.
Welterweight: Maimaitituersun Qiong  def. Byambyn Tüvshinbat  by RSCI. Maimaitituersun and Tüvshinbat, along with third-placed Amin Ghasemipour , qualify for the Olympics. 
Middleweight: Abbos Atoev  def. Nursahat Pazziyev  4–3. Atoev and Pazziyev, along with the semifinalists Sobirjon Nazarov  and Vijender Singh , qualify for the Olympics. 
Light heavyweight: Sumit Sangwan  def. Jahon Qurbonov  14–9. Sangwan and Qurbonov, along with third-placed Ihab Al-Matbouli , qualify for the Olympics.
Heavyweight: Ali Mazaheri  def. Mohammad Ghossoun  14–11. Mazaheri qualifies for the Olympics. 
Super heavyweight: Zhang Zhilei  def. Soumar Ghossoun  10–6. Zhang qualifies for the Olympics.

Football (soccer)
Copa Libertadores second stage, matchday 6 (teams in bold advance to the Round of 16):
Group 2:
Flamengo  3–0  Lanús
Olimpia  2–3  Emelec
Standings: Lanús 10 points, Emelec 9, Flamengo 8, Olimpia 7.
Group 5: 
Nacional  0–1  Vasco da Gama
Alianza Lima  1–2  Libertad
Standings: Libertad, Vasco da Gama 13 points, Nacional 6, Alianza Lima 3.

Ice hockey
World U18 Championship Preliminary round, game 1:
Group A:
 1–6 
 0–4 
Group B:
 1–6 
 1–8

April 11, 2012 (Wednesday)

Football (soccer)
AFC Cup group stage, matchday 4:
Group A:
Al-Ittihad  0–2  Al-Suwaiq
Al-Faisaly  1–1  Al-Qadsia
Group C:
Al-Kuwait  1–0  Al-Ahed
Al-Ettifaq  2–0  VB
Group E:
Al-Tilal  0–2  Al-Shorta
Safa  1–0  Al-Zawra'a
Group G:
Home United  3–1  Yangon United
Citizen  3–3  Chonburi

Ice hockey
Women's World Championship Quarterfinals in Burlington, Vermont:
 2–5 
 2–1

April 10, 2012 (Tuesday)

Football (soccer)
AFC Cup group stage, matchday 4:
Group B:
Arbil  2–0  East Bengal
Kazma  1–1  Al-Oruba
Group D:
Al-Oruba  0–0  Neftchi Farg'ona
Salgaocar  1–2  Al-Wehdat
Group F:
Terengganu  0–2  Tampines Rovers
Song Lam Nghe An  1–0  Kitchee
Group H:
Arema  1–3  Kelantan
Ayeyawady United  2–0  Navibank Sài Gòn

Ice hockey
Women's World Championship in Burlington, Vermont, preliminary round (teams in bold advance to the semifinals, teams in italics advance to the quarterfinals):
Group A:
 14–1 
 0–11 
Standings: United States 9 points, Canada 6, Finland 3, Russia 0.
Group B:
 2–3 
 2–4 
Standings: Switzerland 6 points, Sweden 5, Germany 4, Slovakia 3.

April 9, 2012 (Monday)

Football (soccer)
CAF Confederation Cup first round, second leg (first leg score in parentheses): AS Real Bamako  3–1 (0–1)  Gamtel FC. AS Real Bamako win 3–2 on aggregate.

April 8, 2012 (Sunday)

Curling
World Men's Championship:
Bronze medal game:   9–8 
Gold medal game:   8–7 
Canada win the title for the third successive year and the 34th time overall.

Cycling
UCI World Tour:
Paris–Roubaix:  Tom Boonen   Sébastien Turgot   Alessandro Ballan 
UCI World Tour standings (after 10 of 28 races): (1) Boonen 366 points (2) Simon Gerrans  210 (3) Samuel Sánchez  208

Football (soccer)
CAF Champions League first round, second leg (first leg scores in parentheses):
AS Vita Club  2–3 (0–0)  ASO Chlef. ASO Chlef win 3–2 on aggregate.
Africa Sports  2–1 (0–1)  Zamalek. 2–2 on aggregate; Zamalek win on away goals.
Maghreb de Fès  3–0 (1–1)  Horoya AC. Maghreb de Fès win 4–1 on aggregate.
Al-Ahly  3–0 (0–0)  Ethiopian Coffee. Al-Ahly win 3–0 on aggregate.
Sunshine Stars  3–0 (1–4)  Recreativo do Libolo. 4–4 on aggregate; Sunshine Stars win on away goals.
Dynamos  1–0 (2–2)  Liga Muçulmana. Dynamos win 3–2 on aggregate.
Coton Sport  1–0 (1–2)  Dolphins. 2–2 on aggregate; Coton Sport win on away goals.
Raja Casablanca  3–0 (0–5)  Berekum Chelsea. Berekum Chelsea win 5–3 on aggregate.
TP Mazembe  6–0 (1–1)  Power Dynamos. TP Mazembe win 7–1 on aggregate.
CAF Confederation Cup first round, second leg (first leg scores in parentheses):
CODM Meknès  3–0 (2–0)  FC Séquence. CODM Meknès win 5–0 on aggregate.
Al-Ahli Shendi  2–0 (1–0)  Ferroviário de Maputo. Al-Ahli Shendi win 3–0 on aggregate.
Heartland  2–1 (0–0)  Unisport Bafang. Heartland win 2–1 on aggregate.
Inter Luanda  2–0 (a.e.t.) (0–2)  Tana FC. 2–2 on aggregate; Inter Luanda win 6–5 on penalties.
Amal Atbara  0–0 (1–1)  Hwange. 1–1 on aggregate; Amal Atbara win on away goals.

Golf
Men's major championships:
Masters Tournament:
Winner: Bubba Watson  278 (−10)
Watson wins his first major title.

Handball
Olympics Men's Qualification Tournaments, final matchday (teams in bold qualify for the Olympics):
Tournament 1 in Alicante, Spain:
 26–18 
 33–22 
Standings: Spain 6 points, Serbia, Poland 3, Algeria 0.
Tournament 2 in Gothenburg, Sweden:
 28–27 
 26–23 
Standings: Sweden 6 points, Hungary 4, Brazil 2, Macedonia 0. 
Tournament 3 in Varaždin, Croatia: 
 33–26 
 31–28 
Standings: Croatia 6 points, Iceland 4, Japan 2, Chile 0.

Ice hockey
Women's World Championship in Burlington, Vermont, preliminary round:
Group A:
 3–2 
 9–0 
Group B:
 2–1 
 2–1

Motorcycle racing
MotoGP:
Qatar Grand Prix in Losail, Qatar (ESP unless stated):
MotoGP: (1) Jorge Lorenzo (Yamaha) (2) Dani Pedrosa (Honda) (3) Casey Stoner  (Honda)
Moto2: (1) Marc Márquez (Suter) (2) Andrea Iannone  (Speed Up) (3) Pol Espargaró (Kalex)
Moto3: (1) Maverick Viñales (FTR Honda) (2) Romano Fenati  (FTR Honda) (3) Sandro Cortese  (KTM)

Rugby union
Heineken Cup Quarter-finals:
Munster  16–22  Ulster
Saracens  3–22  Clermont Auvergne
European Challenge Cup Quarter-finals: Brive  15–11  Scarlets

Tennis
Davis Cup World Group Quarterfinals:
 4–1 
David Ferrer  def. Jürgen Melzer  7–5, 6–3, 6–3
Nicolás Almagro  def. Alexander Peya  7–5, 7–5
 2–3 
John Isner  def. Jo-Wilfried Tsonga  6–3, 7–6(4), 5–7, 6–3
Gilles Simon  def. Ryan Harrison  6–2, 6–3
 4–1 
Tomáš Berdych  def. Janko Tipsarević  7–6(6), 7–6(6), 7–6(7)
Lukáš Rosol  def. Viktor Troicki  7–6(5), 7–5
 4–1 
Juan Martín del Potro  def. Marin Čilić  6–1, 6–2, 6–1
Juan Mónaco  def. Antonio Veić  6–1, 6–1
WTA Tour:
Family Circle Cup in Charleston, South Carolina, United States:
Final: Serena Williams  def. Lucie Šafářová  6–0, 6–1
Williams wins her second Charleston title, and her 40th WTA title overall.

April 7, 2012 (Saturday)

Cycling
UCI World Tour:
Tour of the Basque Country, stage 6: (1) Samuel Sánchez  (2) Bauke Mollema  (3) Tony Martin 
Final general classification:  Sánchez  Joaquim Rodríguez   Mollema

Football (soccer)
CAF Champions League first round, second leg (first leg scores in parentheses):
AFAD Djékanou  3–0 (2–1)  JSM Béjaïa. AFAD Djékanou win 5–1 on aggregate.
Al-Merreikh  3–0 (2–2)  FC Platinum. Al-Merreikh win 5–2 on aggregate.
CAF Confederation Cup first round, second leg (first leg scores in parentheses):
US Tshinkunku  1–2 (1–1)  Royal Leopards. Royal Leopards win 3–2 on aggregate.
Club Africain  2–0 (1–1)  Saint-George SA. Club Africain win 3–1 on aggregate.
CS Sfaxien  0–2 (2–1)  AC Léopard. AC Léopard win 3–2 on aggregate.
ENPPI  4–1 (1–1)  LLB Académic. ENPPI win 5–2 on aggregate.
Wydad Casablanca  4–1 (2–0)  Invincible Eleven. Wydad Casablanca win 6–1 on aggregate.

Handball
Olympics Men's Qualification Tournaments, matchday 2:
Tournament 1 in Alicante, Spain:
 25–25 
 20–28 
Tournament 2 in Gothenburg, Sweden:
 27–29 
 23–27 
Tournament 3 in Varaždin, Croatia:
 15–35 
 30–41

Ice hockey
Women's World Championship in Burlington, Vermont, preliminary round:
Group A:
 5–4 
 9–2 
Group B:
 1–5 
 2–3

Rugby union
Heineken Cup Quarter-finals:
Edinburgh  19–14  Toulouse
Leinster  34–3  Cardiff Blues
European Challenge Cup Quarter-finals: London Wasps  23–26  Biarritz

Tennis
Davis Cup World Group Quarterfinals
 2–1 
Oliver Marach/Alexander Peya  def. Marcel Granollers/Marc López  3–6, 6–4, 6–4, 7–6(12)
 1–2 
Bob Bryan/Mike Bryan  def. Michaël Llodra/Julien Benneteau 6–4, 6–4, 7–6(4)
 2–1 
Tomáš Berdych/Radek Štěpánek  def. Ilija Bozoljac/Nenad Zimonjić  6–4, 6–2, 7–6(4)
 2–1 
David Nalbandian/Eduardo Schwank  def. Marin Čilić/Ivo Karlović 3–6, 7–6(6), 6–3, 6–7(6), 8–6

April 6, 2012 (Friday)

Football (soccer)
CAF Champions League first round, second leg (first leg scores in parentheses):
Al-Hilal  5–1 (3–0)  DFC 8ème Arrondissement. Al-Hilal win 8–1 on aggregate.
ÉS Sahel  3–2 (0–0)  APR. ES Sahel win 3–2 on aggregate.
Espérance ST  3–1 (1–1)  Brikama United. Espérance ST win 4–2 on aggregate.
CAF Confederation Cup first round, second leg (first leg scores in parentheses):
ASEC Mimosas  2–0 (2–2)  Étoile Filante. ASEC Mimosas win 4–2 on aggregate.
Warri Wolves  2–0 (0–0)  FC Kallon. Warri Wolves win 2–0 on aggregate.
Saint Eloi Lupopo  2–2 (2–4)  Black Leopards. Black Leopards win 6–4 on aggregate.
ES Sétif  3–1 (0–2)  Simba. 3–3 on aggregate; Simba win on away goals.
Cercle Olympique de Bamako  3–1 (2–3)  Renaissance FC. Cercle Olympique de Bamako win 5–4 on aggregate.

Handball
Olympics Men's Qualification Tournaments:
Tournament 1 in Alicante, Spain:
 28–27 
 30–27 
Tournament 2 in Gothenburg, Sweden:
 28–26 
 25–20 
Tournament 3 in Varaždin, Croatia: 
 36–22 
 25–17

Rugby union
European Challenge Cup Quarter-finals: Toulon  37–8  Harlequins

Tennis
Davis Cup World Group Quarterfinals
 2–0 
Nicolás Almagro  def. Jürgen Melzer  6–2, 6–2, 6–4
David Ferrer  def. Andreas Haider-Maurer  6–1, 6–3, 6–1
 1–1 
Jo-Wilfried Tsonga  def. Ryan Harrison  7–5, 6–2, 2–6, 6–2
John Isner  def. Gilles Simon  6–3, 6–2, 7–5
 1–1 
Tomáš Berdych  def. Viktor Troicki  6–2, 6–1, 6–2
Janko Tipsarević  def. Radek Štěpánek  5–7, 6–4, 6–4, 4–6, 9–7
 1–1 
Marin Čilić  def. David Nalbandian  5–7, 6–4, 4–6, 7–6(2), 6–3
Juan Martín del Potro  def. Ivo Karlović  6–2, 7–6(7), 6–1

Water polo
Olympic Qualification Tournament Quarter-finals in Edmonton, Canada (winners qualify for the Olympic Games).
 19–6 
 19–8 
 7–11 
 10–6

April 5, 2012 (Thursday)

Basketball
Euroleague Quarterfinals, game 5: Panathinaikos  86–85  Maccabi Tel Aviv. Panathinaikos win series 3–2.

Football (soccer)
UEFA Europa League Quarter-finals, second leg (first leg scores in parentheses):
Valencia  4–0 (1–2)  AZ. Valencia win 5–2 on aggregate.
Athletic Bilbao  2–2 (4–2)  Schalke 04. Athletic Bilbao win 6–4 on aggregate.
Metalist Kharkiv  1–1 (1–2)  Sporting CP. Sporting CP win 3–2 on aggregate.
Hannover 96  1–2 (1–2)  Atlético Madrid. Atlético Madrid win 4–2 on aggregate.
Copa Libertadores second stage, matchday 5:
Group 1: Juan Aurich  1–0  The Strongest
Group 5: Libertad  2–1  Nacional
UEFA Women's Euro 2013 qualifying:
Group 2:
 13–0 
 0–6 
Group 4:  2–1 
Group 5:
 2–0 
 5–0 
Group 6:  3–1 
Group 7:  1–0 
OFC Women's Pre-Olympic Tournament, second leg (first leg score in parentheses):  0–7 (0–8) 
New Zealand win 15–0 on aggregate and qualify for the Olympic Games.

Rugby union
European Challenge Cup Quarter-finals: Stade Français  22–17  Exeter Chiefs

April 4, 2012 (Wednesday)

Football (soccer)
UEFA Champions League Quarter-finals, second leg (first leg scores in parentheses):
Real Madrid  5–2 (3–0)  APOEL. Real Madrid win 8–2 on aggregate.
Chelsea  2–1 (1–0)  Benfica. Chelsea win 3–1 on aggregate.
Copa Libertadores second stage, matchday 5:
Group 1: Internacional  1–1  Santos
Group 2: Emelec  3–2  Flamengo
Group 3: Junior  3–0  Universidad Católica
Group 8: Godoy Cruz  0–1  Universidad de Chile
AFC Champions League group stage, matchday 3:
Group B:
Pakhtakor  3–1  Al-Arabi
Al-Ittihad  1–0  Bani Yas
Group D:
Al-Shabab  1–1  Al-Hilal
Al-Gharafa  0–3  Persepolis
Group F:
Ulsan Hyundai  1–1  Brisbane Roar
Beijing Guoan  1–1  FC Tokyo
Group H:
Kashiwa Reysol  0–0  Guangzhou Evergrande
Buriram United  0–2  Jeonbuk Hyundai Motors
AFC Cup group stage:
Group B:
East Bengal  0–2  Arbil
Al-Oruba  1–2  Kazma
Group D:
Neftchi Farg'ona  3–1  Al-Oruba
Al-Wehdat  5–0  Salgaocar
Group F:
Kitchee  2–0  Sông Lam Nghệ An
Tampines Rovers  0–1  Terengganu
Group H:
Navibank Sài Gòn  4–1  Ayeyawady United
Kelantan  3–0  Arema
CONCACAF Champions League semifinals, second leg (first leg scores in parentheses):
Santos Laguna  6–2 (1–1)  Toronto FC. Santos Laguna win 7–3 on aggregate.
UNAM  1–1 (0–3)  Monterrey. Monterrey win 4–1 on aggregate.
UEFA Women's Euro 2013 qualifying:
Group 1:
 0–2 
 2–2 
Group 3:
 0–5 
 1–0 
Group 4:  4–0 
Group 7:  0–2

April 3, 2012 (Tuesday)

Football (soccer)
UEFA Champions League Quarter-finals, second leg (first leg scores in parentheses):
Bayern Munich  2–0 (2–0)  Marseille. Bayern Munich win 4–0 on aggregate.
Barcelona  3–1 (0–0)  Milan. Barcelona win 3–1 on aggregate.
Copa Libertadores second stage, matchday 5:
Group 2: Lanús  6–0  Olimpia
Group 5: Alianza Lima  1–2  Vasco da Gama
Group 6: Deportivo Táchira  1–1  Cruz Azul
AFC Champions League group stage, matchday 3:
Group A:
Esteghlal  1–2  Al-Jazira
Al-Rayyan  3–1  Nasaf Qarshi
Group C:
Sepahan  2–1  Lekhwiya
Al-Nasr  1–2  Al-Ahli
Group E:
Gamba Osaka  3–1  Bunyodkor
Pohang Steelers  1–0  Adelaide United
Group G:
Central Coast Mariners  1–1  Seongnam Ilhwa Chunma
Tianjin Teda  0–3  Nagoya Grampus
AFC Cup group stage, matchday 3: 
Group A:
Al-Suwaiq  2–0  Al-Ittihad
Al-Qadsia  1–2  Al-Faisaly
Group C:
Al-Ahed  0–4  Al-Kuwait
VB  3–6  Al-Ettifaq
Group E: 
Al-Zawra'a  1–0  Safa
Al-Shorta  3–0  Al-Tilal
Group G:
Yangon United  0–0  Home United
Chonburi  2–0  Citizen

April 2, 2012 (Monday)

April 1, 2012 (Sunday)

Auto racing
World Rally Championship:
Rally de Portugal: (1) Mads Østberg  (Ford Fiesta RS WRC) (2) Evgeny Novikov  (Ford Fiesta RS WRC) (3) Petter Solberg  (Ford Fiesta RS WRC)
Østberg wins his first rally.
Sprint Cup Series:
Goody's Fast Relief 500 in Ridgeway, Virginia: (1)  Ryan Newman (Chevrolet; Stewart-Haas Racing) (2)  A. J. Allmendinger (Dodge; Penske Racing) (3)  Dale Earnhardt Jr. (Chevrolet; Hendrick Motorsports)
IndyCar Series:
Indy Grand Prix of Alabama in Birmingham, Alabama: (1) Will Power  (Team Penske) (2) Scott Dixon  (Chip Ganassi Racing) (3) Hélio Castroneves  (Team Penske)

Basketball
EuroLeague Women:
Third place game: Fenerbahçe  68–75   UMMC Ekaterinburg
Final:  Rivas Ecópolis  52–65   Ros Casares
Ros Casares win the title for the first time.

Cycling
UCI World Tour:
Tour of Flanders:  Tom Boonen   Filippo Pozzato   Alessandro Ballan 
UCI Women's Road World Cup:
Tour of Flanders:  Judith Arndt   Kristin Armstrong   Joëlle Numainville

Football (soccer)
UEFA Women's Euro 2013 qualifying:
Group 7:  2–4

References

IIII
April 2012 sports events